The Lion Roars is a 2002 Hong Kong comedy film produced and directed by Joe Ma. The film starred Louis Koo and Cecilia Cheung

Plot
During the Soong Dynasty, a beautiful woman named Moth Liu is searching for a husband, but is unable to find one until she hears the avant-garde poetry of Seasonal Chan. Soon the two are married and Chan discovers that his new bride is violently temperamental and insanely jealous, who limits his activities and lifestyle. When a princess falls in love with the poet and the Emperor decrees that Chan must take the princess in as a second-wife. The love between Liu and Chan is put to the test.

Cast
Louis Koo as Seasonal Chan
Cecilia Cheung as Moth Liu
Benz Hui as So Tung-po
Wyman Wong as Super Double Baldes Liu
Fan Bingbing as Princess Ping'an
Raymond Wong Ho-yin as Long
Mou Jian as Emperor
Emotion Cheung as Wong Choy
Joe Lee as Yau

References

External links
 
 HK Cinemagic entry
 
 lovehkfilm.com

2002 films
2002 comedy films
Hong Kong slapstick comedy films
2000s Cantonese-language films
China Star Entertainment Group films
Films directed by Joe Ma
Films set in 11th-century Song dynasty
Cultural depictions of Su Shi
2000s Hong Kong films